may refer to:
Teshio District, Hokkaidō, a district in Hokkaidō
Teshio, Hokkaidō, a town
Teshio Province, an old province
Teshio Mountains, a mountain range
Teshio River